The Serbian Orthodox Eparchy of Western America or Serbian Orthodox Diocese of Western America is a Serbian Orthodox Church diocese located in the western region of the United States. Its headquarters are in Alhambra, California. The primary mission of the Diocese of Western America is to preserve and foster the faith, heritage, traditions, and culture, and religious and national values of the Serbian Orthodox Church, and to provide spiritual guidance to more than 600,000 Serbian-Americans in almost 50 churches, parishes, monasteries and children's summer camps in Alaska, Arizona, California, Colorado, Hawaii, Idaho, Montana, Nevada, Oregon, Utah, and Washington. It also covers the territory of Mexico.

Bishop

Bishop Maksim Vasiljević was elected Bishop of the Western American Diocese of the Serbian Orthodox Church in North and South American at the regular assembly of the Hierarchs of the Serbian Orthodox Church in Belgrade, Serbia in 2006. Bishop Maksim is a professor of Patristics at the Theological Faculty of the University of Belgrade and was teaching Christian Anthropology and Sociology at the University of East Sarajevo and Patrology at the St. Sava School of Theology in Libertyville, Illinois. Bishop Maksim graduated from the Faculty of Orthodox Theology, University of Belgrade, in 1993. He completed his Masters of Theology at the University of Athens in 1996, and then three years later, in 1999, at the same university, he defended his doctorate in the field of Dogmatics and Patristics. He worked for one year on his post-doctorate in Paris and the Sorbonne in 2003–04, in the field of Byzantine History and Hagiography. During this time, he also delved into the theory and practical application of painting at the French Academy of Fine Arts in Paris. Bishop Maksim speaks Serbian, Greek, French, Russian, and English. He was the editor of Theology – Journal of the Faculty of Orthodox Theology, University of Belgrade. He also leads the Diocesan iconographical school inspired by Byzantine and Serbian medieval fresco painting and by Fr. Stamatis Skliris. Bishop Maksim's scholarly books, studies, and articles include essays on Holy Fathers and Saints; he has also written on hagiographical and iconographical themes.

See also
 St. Sava Church (Douglas, Alaska)
 St. Nilus Island Skete
 St. Archangel Michael Skete
 Saint Herman of Alaska Monastery
 St. Xenia Serbian Orthodox Skete
 Monastery of the Meeting of the Lord (Escondido, California)
 Holy Resurrection (Fallbrook, California)
 Monastery of St. Paisius, Safford

References

Sources

External links
 Diocese of Western America

Religious sees of the Serbian Orthodox Church
Serbian Orthodox Church in the United States
Serbian-American history
Alhambra, California
Eastern Orthodoxy in California
Eastern Orthodoxy in Alaska
Eastern Orthodoxy in Arizona
Eastern Orthodoxy in Colorado
Eastern Orthodoxy in Hawaii
Eastern Orthodoxy in Idaho
Eastern Orthodoxy in Montana
Eastern Orthodoxy in Nevada
Eastern Orthodoxy in Oregon
Eastern Orthodoxy in Utah
Eastern Orthodoxy in Washington (state)
Eastern Orthodoxy in Mexico